Joonas Rask (born 24 March 1990) is a Finnish professional ice hockey forward. He is currently playing with Luleå HF of the Swedish Hockey League (SHL). He played 2 games in the National Hockey League with the Nashville Predators during the 2012–13 season. He is the younger brother of former goaltender Tuukka Rask.

Playing career
Rask was selected by the Nashville Predators in the 7th round (198th overall) of the 2010 NHL Entry Draft.

Before coming to North America, Rask played for Ilves in the then Finnish SM-liiga. On 23 March 2012, Rask opted to sign a two-year entry level contract with the Nashville Predators. In the following season, Rask remained in Finland as he was loaned to Jokerit by the Predators. Upon completion of the Finnish season Rask then moved to North America to end the 2012–13 season, appearing in 2 games with the Predators, contributing with an assist.

In the last year of his contract with the Predators, Rask was assigned to American Hockey League affiliate, the Milwaukee Admirals for the duration of the 2013–14 season. In a disappointing transition to North American hockey, he produced just 14 points in 58 games with the Admirals.

On 8 June 2014, Rask opted to return to Finland signing a two-year contract as a restricted free agent from the Predators with HIFK.

After five seasons in the Liiga with HIFK, Rask left following the 2018–19, signing a two-year contract with Swedish club, Örebro HK of the SHL on 20 April 2019.

Career statistics

Regular season and playoffs

International

References

External links
 

1990 births
Living people
Finnish ice hockey centres
HIFK (ice hockey) players
Ilves players
Jokerit players
Luleå HF players
Milwaukee Admirals players
Nashville Predators draft picks
Nashville Predators players
Örebro HK players
People from Savonlinna
Sportspeople from South Savo